Events in the year 1194 in Norway.

Incumbents
Monarch: Sverre Sigurdsson

Events
 3 April - Battle of Florvåg.

Arts and literature

Births

Deaths
3 April – Sigurd Magnusson, nobleman (born c. 1180).

References

Norway